DYRB (540 AM) Radyo Pilipino is a radio station owned and operated by Radyo Pilipino Media Group through its licensee Radio Audience Developers Integrated Organization (RADIO), Inc. Its studio is located at 2nd Floor, Unit #4 M. Pacubas Dr., Brgy. Mambaling, Cebu City, and its transmitter is located at Sitio Seaside Alumnos, Brgy. Basak San Nicolas, Cebu City. This station operates daily from 4:30 AM to 8:00 PM.

History
DYRB was founded on January 1, 1970, with a music format. It was originally owned by Allied Broadcasting Center. In the 1980s, the station carried the branding Radio Bisaya. Back then, its studios were located at 479 C. Padilla St. In the middle of 2008, DYRB was acquired by the Radio Corporation of the Philippines and switched to a news and public service format. In 2017, the station transferred to its current location in Brgy. Mambaling. By 2020, all of RadioCorp's stations carry the Radyo Pilipino branding. In mid-2021, the station started hooked-up its programming from Radyo Pilipino Manila (notably Pulsong Pinoy which is also simulcast on RPN DYKC Radyo Ronda).

References

Radio stations in Metro Cebu
Radio stations established in 1970